Elisa T. Lee (born May 1, 1939) is a Chinese-American statistician, affiliated with the University of Oklahoma Health Sciences Center, where she is Regents Professor Emeritus,
George Lynn Cross Research Professor of Biostatistics and Epidemiology, and
director of the Center for American Indian Health Research.

Biography 
Lee was born on May 1, 1939 in Yungsing, China.
She earned a bachelor's degree from National Taiwan University in 1961,
a master's degree from the University of California, Berkeley in 1964,
and a PhD from New York University in 1973.
She is a naturalized U.S. citizen.

She worked for Bell Laboratories from 1965 to 1971, and then for the University of Texas MD Anderson Cancer Center from 1971 to 1975, before moving to the University of Oklahoma.
With John Wang, she is the author of Statistical Methods for Survival Data Analysis (Wiley, 1980; 4th ed., 2013).

She became a fellow of the American Statistical Association in 1996.

References

Living people
American statisticians
Taiwanese statisticians
Women statisticians
National Taiwan University alumni
University of California, Berkeley alumni
New York University alumni
University of Oklahoma faculty
Fellows of the American Statistical Association
1939 births